Suite en Blanc, later retitled Noir et Blanc, is a ballet choreographed by Serge Lifar to music from Édouard Lalo's ballet Namouna. The first performance, by the Paris Opera Ballet, took place on 19 June 1943 in Zurich. The original costumes were all white, whence the title ("Suite in White"), but in subsequent productions the male dancers wore black and the title was changed to reflect this ("Black and White").

References

Sources
The Oxford Dictionary of Dance (p.431), Debra Craine, Judith Mackrell, 2nd ed 2010 ]

1943 ballet premieres
Ballets by Serge Lifar
Ballets to the music of Édouard Lalo